Bergantiños is a comarca in the Galician Province of A Coruña. The overall population of this local region is 70,698 (2005).

Populated places
Buño
Cabana de Bergantiños
Carballo
Coristanco
A Laracha
Laxe
Malpica de Bergantiños
Ponteceso

Comarcas of the Province of A Coruña